Lina Eve is an Australian artist, adoption activist, singer/songwriter, photographer and filmmaker.

Life and work
Lina Eve was born in Germany to Polish parents. Her father was a Holocaust survivor, and, to escape war torn Europe, the family immigrated to Australia in 1951. At 17 years old, pregnant and unmarried, she lost her first child to Forced Adoption In Australia in 1964.

Eve travelled back to Europe where she worked on a kibbutz in Israel; as a folk-singer in London; as a model in Greece and Paris; and as a silversmith, travelling overland between Europe and the East. In Australia she has worked as a singer/songwriter, photographer, visual artist, and as a filmmaker.

Eve started painting in 1994 studying Fine Arts at Southern Cross University, in Lismore, NSW, and sold her first paintings in the same year. Her paintings have been selling locally, nationally and internationally ever since. Her Bad Girl series, music, and videos have enhanced her activism in adoption reform and, along with her Holocaust series, Reclaiming my Family History,  have led to  recognition in Australia, the United States and Europe.

After venturing into the world of filmmaking, she won the Best Australian Music Video Award at the WOW Film Festival in Sydney in 2009, for Bitter Wind.

Exhibitions

Solo exhibitions
“Bad Girl” & “People and Places”  Roxy Gallery Kyogle Feb 2008
Mental Health Conference, Liverpool Sydney, 2002
“Tributes”  Upstairs Gallery, Lismore. Jan 18- Feb 18, 1999
“Reclaiming my Family History” Roxy Gallery, Kyogle. Nov. 21, 1997.

Group exhibitions
“Bad Girl Series” Black Mountain Clubhouse, NC. USA 2005
“Neurotic Visionaries & Paranoid Jews” Makor, NYC, NY, USA April 2005
“SAGAS”  (Secret Adoption Grief Art Show) New Jersey, USA 2000
“SAGAS”  Washington, USA 2000
Bastard Nation Conference in Atlantic City  USA. 1999
“The Holocaust through the Eyes of the Artist”
Wilshire Boulevard Temple, LA, USA, Sept. 1999
Mental Health Conference, Wacol, QLD, 2004
“Yesterday, Today and Tomorrow”   Lismore Regional Gallery Feb, 2003
“The Poetics of Survival” with Bonney Bombach, Gold Coast Gallery,  1999
“Faces” Exhibition, Upstairs Gallery, Lismore.
Women Artist’s Diary Exhibition, Waywood Gallery, 1998
“Guava Jelly Show”,  Coldstream Yamba. 1997
Portrait Exhibition, Coldstream Yamba.1997
“Cultural Alternatives” Roxy Gallery Kyogle 1997.
Women Artist’s Diary Exhibition, Brooklet House, 1997
“In Focus” Photographic Exhibition, Roxy Gallery Kyogle, Oct. 17, 1997.
Southern Cross University Graduation Show. 1996
Lismore Regional Gallery.1996
“The Painter’s Exhibition”, Chocolate Factory, Lismore.1996
Bare Bones Gallery,  Group shows, Bangalow. 1996 & 1997
Epicenter, Byron Bay.1996
Stanthorpe Regional Gallery. 1996
Southern Cross University Museum, 1996
Trinity Arts Festival, Lismore.1996

Prizes

Winner Best Australian Music Video “Bitter Winds”  WOW film festival Sydney 2009
1st  prize photography Bentley Art Show. 1997.
First Prize, Ilford Photographic Competition for 3rd Year Tertiary Students, 1998
First Prize for Photography, Bentley Art Show. 1998.
First Prize, Ilford Photographic Competition for 2nd Year Tertiary Students, 1997
Third Prize, Ilford Photographic Competition for 3rd Yr Tertiary Students, 1996
WA. Finalist  Mandorla Art Prize, New Norcia Gallery, 1996

References

External links

1946 births
Living people
Australian women painters
Southern Cross University alumni
20th-century Australian women artists
20th-century Australian artists
21st-century Australian women artists
21st-century Australian artists